Oibek Saidiyev (born 11 July 1987) is a male Kazakhstani recurve archer. He competed in the individual recurve event  and the team recurve event at the 2015 World Archery Championships in Copenhagen, Denmark.

References

External links
 

Kazakhstani male archers
Living people
Place of birth missing (living people)
1987 births
Archers at the 2006 Asian Games
Archers at the 2010 Asian Games
Archers at the 2014 Asian Games
Asian Games competitors for Kazakhstan
21st-century Kazakhstani people